One Union of Regional Staff (OURS) was a trade union in the United Kingdom.

The union was formed in early 2010 by the merger of the Derbyshire Group Staff Union and the Cheshire Group Staff Union.  It organises former Derbyshire Building Society and Cheshire Building Society workers now employed by the Nationwide Building Society and is affiliated to the Trades Union Congress.

The members of OURS voted to merge with the Nationwide Group Staff Union, and this process was completed on 1 September 2011.

References

Trade unions established in 2010
Trade unions disestablished in 2011
Defunct trade unions of the United Kingdom
2010 establishments in the United Kingdom
2011 disestablishments in the United Kingdom
Finance sector trade unions
Trade unions in Wales